Johannes Kardiono (born 25 December 1963) is an Indonesian sprinter. He competed in the men's 4 × 100 metres relay at the 1984 Summer Olympics.

References

1963 births
Living people
Athletes (track and field) at the 1984 Summer Olympics
Indonesian male sprinters
Olympic athletes of Indonesia
Place of birth missing (living people)
20th-century Indonesian people